Shlomi or Shelomi is a Hebrew name (שלומי or in its Biblical spelling שלמי). It has become popular as a first name in Israel. It also serves as a substitute or pet form of the more traditional name Shlomo (שלמה).

The correct Biblical pronunciation is with the stress on the "mi" (in "Milra3"), but most Israelis pronounce it with the stress on the "lo" ("Mil3el").

Shlomi means "My Shalom" where "Shalom" is well-being or peace.  It may also mean "The Shalom of 'Y'" where "Y" is the Hebrew short for Jehovah, or possibly "having the property of Shalom." (= "Shalom-ful" in English).

Shlomi is also an Israeli development town in the north-west of Israel.

Hebrew-language names